The Turkestan–Siberian Railway (commonly abbreviated as the Turk–Sib,) is a  broad gauge railway that connects Central Asia with Siberia. It starts north of Tashkent in Uzbekistan at Arys, where it branches off from the Trans-Aral Railway. It heads roughly northeast through Shymkent, Taraz, Bishkek (on a spur) to the former Kazakh capital of Almaty.  There it turns northward to Semey before crossing the Russian border.  It passes through Barnaul before ending at Novosibirsk, where it meets the West Siberian portion of the Trans-Siberian Railway. The bulk of construction work was undertaken between 1926 and 1931.

Construction history 

The idea of a railway between Siberia and Russian Turkestan was aired as early as 1886, but it was supplanted by that of a more practicable line between Tashkent and Orenburg in the Urals. On 15 October 1896 the Verny town duma set up a commission to examine the feasibility of building a Turkestan–Siberia Railway. It was expected that the line would facilitate the transport of cotton from Turkestan to Siberia and cheap Siberian grain from Russia to the Fergana Valley. An eastern branch would enhance Russia's military and economic presence on the Chinese border.

In 1906 the Russian imperial government decided to finance the construction of the first section, between Barnaul and Arys. A team of Russian engineers made a detailed survey of the steppe and semi-desert regions the railway was expected to cross. On 21 October 1915 the northern section linking Novosibirsk and Semipalatinsk as the Altai Railway. The missing Arys–Pishpek–Tokmak section, officially known as Semipalatinsk Railway, was left to be built by a French-financed Russian-managed private railway consortium. World War I put an end to this project.

The remaining  railway were constructed with great fanfare as part of the first five-year plan between 1928 and 1932.

Regular passenger service was finally established between Semipalatinsk and Ayaguz on 10 May 1929. The Turksib was completed on 21 April 1930. The locomotive which pioneered the route going from Tashkent to Semipalatinsk (Э-1441(rus)) later became a part of a memorial in Alma-Ata.

Viktor Alexandrovitsh Turin directed a 1929 Soviet documentary film on the building of the railway which also bore the name Turksib.

Connectivity 

Years after the Turksib was completed, it was joined at Shu by Kazakhstan's main north-south line, which  serves Karaganda, Nur-Sultan and Petropavlovsk, on one of the main Transsib routes.

In 1990, Aktogay station, roughly midway between Alma-Ata and Semipalatinsk, became an important junction. Lines from there run east, connecting at Dostyk with China's Lanxin railway Line (toward Urumqi, Lanzhou, and heartland China); and west, to Balkhash and Karaganda.

References

Vitali A. Rakov. Russian Locomotives, 2nd ed. Moscow, 1995.
Inkerin suomalaiset GPU:n kourissa. Helsinki 1942. Inkerin karkoitettujen kirjeitä. Helsinki 1943.
Eugene Lyons, Locomotives Come to Central Asia, a chapter in Assignment in Utopia

Further reading

 Dobson, G. (1890). Russia’s railway advance into Central Asia. W.H. Allen & Co. Good account for background on Russia, Central Asia and railways. Public Domain.

External links
 On the Legendary Turksib railway; Qazaqstan Tarihy порталы, 19 September 2018.
 Video: Turksib (1929). Classic Soviet rail documentary. Short version. English commentary & introduction
 Turksib 1929 / Турксиб (English Subtitles)

Rail transport in the Soviet Union
Railway lines in Russia
Rail transport in Siberia
Railway lines in Kazakhstan
Rail transport in Kyrgyzstan
Rail transport in Uzbekistan
Railway lines opened in 1931
International railway lines
Articles containing video clips